The Mayur Vihar Phase 1  is an interchange metro station is on the Blue Line and Pink Line of the Delhi Metro. It is an interchange station with the Pink Line was opened on 31 December 2018. The station is within walking distance from Pocket I and IV. Cycle-rickshaws and minibuses are available for Pocket II, Trilokpuri and Kalyanpuri. The station's design is elevated so one can view the skyline of Commonwealth Sports Village and the flood plain of river Yamuna. The Pink Line station of Mayur Vihar Phase-I is the tallest metro station of Delhi Metro with platforms at a height of 22 meters.

Station layout

Facilities
List of available ATM at Mayur Vihar-1 metro station are HDFC Bank Punjab National Bank.

Gallery

See also
List of Delhi Metro stations
Transport in Delhi
Delhi Metro Rail Corporation
Delhi Suburban Railway

References

External links
 Delhi Metro Rail Corporation Ltd. (Official site) 
 Delhi Metro Annual Reports
 
 UrbanRail.Net – descriptions of all metro systems in the world, each with a schematic map showing all stations.

Delhi Metro stations
Railway stations opened in 2009
2009 establishments in Delhi
Railway stations in East Delhi district